25zero is a mountaineering project, tracking equatorial glacial melt and raising awareness of the impacts of climate change, led by explorer Tim Jarvis AM. The project was founded in 2014, and focussed on bringing live footage from the peaks of three mountain glaciers to the 37,000 delegates at the COP21 summit in Paris, France, as a way of showcasing the impact of global warming on vulnerable and remote areas.

In 2016, following the 2015 summit, the 25zero project grew into a documentary film production, with a broader focus on both the glaciers themselves and the communities that live near them. The longer film, entitled 25zero: East Africa, is due for release in 2021, according to the project's website.

Naming the project 
While many mountains straddle the equator, only 25 of these have a glacier at their peak (defined at the time of the United Nations Framework Convention on Climate Change adoption in 1992); hence, 25 mountains at zero latitude. In reality, however, there are about three degrees (some 320 km) of leniency in the inclusions, both North and South. Additionally, the name wordplays on estimates that within an average of 25 years, all these glaciers will have retreated to zero ice.

According to the project team, this is important because melting ice is an excellent proxy indicator for climate change impacts. While much of the public global interest centres around ice-melt at the Earth's poles, relatively little attention is given to the ice at more unexpected locations, such as in the high-altitude tropics.

Since 1992, four of the 25 mountains originally included have 'lost' their glacier completely.

Methodology 
The notional baseline date for mountains included in the 25zero project are those mountains that had glaciers in 1992, when the UN started to "began to take climate change (and acting on it) seriously". After several years of UNFCCC processes, the Kyoto Protocol was signed in 1997. Around that time, 25 mountains at the equator had glaciers. The project uses climbing expeditions to the various mountain ranges to support published glaciology data, effectively tracking the status of the equatorial glaciers against the backdrop of the UN timeline on climate change action.

Climbing team 
The 25zero climbing team has varied over time depending on the expedition, although the original 2014 team comprised:

 Tim Jarvis
 Ed Wardle
 Heidi Sand
 Vanessa O'Brien
 Khoo Swee Chiow
 Barry 'Baz' Gray

The up-to-date team are listed on the project website, 25zero.

Mountains 
While the 25zero mountains are spread around the world, more than half of them are located in the South American Andes mountain range, and chiefly in Ecuador.

Ecuador 
 Antisana
 Carihuairazo
 Cayambe
 Cerro Ayapungo
 Cerro Hermoso
 Chimborazo
 Collay
 Cotopaxi
 El Altar
 Illiniza Sur
 Quilindaña
 Sangay
 Saraurcu
 Sincholagua

Colombia 
 Nevado de Santa Isabel
 Nevado del Huila
 Nevado del Quindío
 Nevado del Ruiz
 Nevado del Tolima

Kenya 
 Mount Kenya

Uganda 
 Mount Stanley
 Mount Speke
 Mount Baker

Tanzania 
 Mount Kilimanjaro

Indonesia 
 Carstensz Pyramid

Additionally, the project lists a number of 'recently deceased' glaciers, which it defines as no longer being able to detect permanent glacial ice. These three are all in Ecuador:
 Cubillín
 Cotacachi
 Tungurahua

Glacier status 

According to some glaciologists, contradictory information exists in the literature as to whether glaciers on Sangay and Cerro Ayapungo (locally known as Soroche) are true glaciers or only permanent snow (névé or firn).

The climbs

2015 
In December 2015, to coincide with the COP21 climate change talks in Paris, multiple 25zero teams scaled a number of the 25zero peaks. Jarvis and a core team summited Carstensz Pyramid (4,884 m) in Indonesia, and Mount Stanley (5,109 m) and Mount Baker (4,844 m) in Uganda. Simultaneously, other 25zero teams climbed Mount Kenya (5,199 m), Kilimanjaro (5,895 m) and a number of Ecuadorian peaks. Footage, observations and stories from these climbs were transmitted to a government-endorsed press conference for 25zero at COP21 in Paris.

2016 
In 2016, Jarvis and colleague Royal Marines Sergeant Major Barry Gray went on an information-gathering and mountain-climbing expedition to Ecuador for the 25zero project. They successfully summited three glaciated mountains in Ecuador: Illiniza Sur (5,248 m), Antisana (5,704 m) and Chimborazo (6,310 m). The trip coincided with the ongoing UN climate change talks in Marrakech (COP22).

2017 
In September 2017, Jarvis together with Ecuadorian climbers Edgar Parra and Ethan Sigle summited Carihuazo (5,018 m), and climbed and documented glacier decline on Cayambe (5,790 m) and Cotopaxi (5,897 m).

2018 
In June 2018, Jarvis assembled a large climbing team, including a film crew and several social media and mountaineering identities, to undertake climbs in East Africa, including Kilimanjaro, Mount Speke, and Mount Stanley.

Awards 
25zero (and the project team) has received a number of awards for contribution to conservation and public education.

Australian Geographic Society, 2016 
The project has received citation through the annual awards of the Australian Geographic Society, with project leader Tim Jarvis receiving the title of Conservationist of the Year in 2016, for his work on 25zero. The Society had also supported the expedition.

Bettison-James Award, 2016 
Jarvis was jointly awarded the Jim Bettison and Helen James Award in 2016 in recognition of the 25zero project. The award is patronised by the Jim Bettison and Helen James Foundation, and recognises "lifelong high achievement in an area of expertise and enable further work of benefit to the community" and administered by the Adelaide Film Festival and the Adelaide Festival of Ideas.

References 

Glaciology